During the 1989–90 English football season, Brentford competed in the Football League Third Division. After showing relegation form during the first three months of the season, a revival between November 1989 and February 1990 ensured a mid-table finish.

Season summary 
 
After a long season in which the sheer amount of cup fixtures ultimately affected Brentford's hopes of a finish in the Third Division play-offs, manager Steve Perryman saw fit to make only minor changes to his squad. Released were bit-part players and late-season signings Andy Feeley, Graham Pearce, Jon Purdie, Jeremy Roberts and Tony Sealy and in came just two players – club record £167,000 midfielder Eddie May from Hibernian (as a direct replacement for March 1989 departee Andy Sinton) and left back Mark Fleming on a free transfer from Queens Park Rangers.

Aside from progressing to the second round of the League Cup, Brentford had a torrid start to the Third Division season and dropped into the relegation places on 9 September 1989. Manager Perryman entered the transfer market to bring Watford forward Dean Holdsworth back to Griffin Park, after a one-month loan spell during the previous season. The £125,000 paid for Holdsworth made him the club's most expensive forward at the time. The signing of Holdsworth had little immediate impact and the Bees' slump continued from September into mid-November, when the club occupied bottom place in the division for three weeks in a row. A 2–0 win over Northampton Town at the County Ground on 25 November provided the spark that changed the team's fortunes, with Holdsworth coming into form and inspiring a run of 10 wins and 1 draw from a 13-match spell, which lifted Brentford from 24th to 9th place. The Bees stumbled through to the end of the season and the products of Colin Lee's youth team were given game time. Brentford ended the campaign in 13th place.

League table

Results
Brentford's goal tally listed first.

Legend

Pre-season and friendlies

Football League Third Division

FA Cup

Football League Cup

Football League Trophy 

 Sources: The Big Brentford Book of the Eighties,Croxford, Lane & Waterman, p. 412-415. Statto

Playing squad 
Players' ages are as of the opening day of the 1989–90 season.

 Sources: The Big Brentford Book of the Eighties, Timeless Bees

Coaching staff

Statistics

Appearances and goals
Substitute appearances in brackets.

Players listed in italics left the club mid-season.
Source: The Big Brentford Book of the Eighties

Goalscorers 

Players listed in italics left the club mid-season.
Source: The Big Brentford Book of the Eighties

Management

Summary

Transfers & loans

Kit

|
|

Awards 
 Supporters' Player of the Year: Terry Evans
 Players' Player of the Year: Terry Evans

References 

Brentford F.C. seasons
Brentford